John Wesley Dearth III is an American guitarist and singer.

Biography
His professional career began in the early 1980s in the Tampa Bay area where he founded 1991 Southwestern Music Conference's showcase act Autodrive along with drummer/producer Mark Prator. The following year, Wesley embarked on a solo career and became the opening act for British rockers Marillion on seven consecutive tour legs around the world, especially North and South America, the UK and Europe.

In 1998, Wesley and ex–White Lion frontman Mike Tramp were the opening act for the Peter Frampton/Lynyrd Skynyrd tour. Following this was several world tours with Marillion's former singer Fish. In 2001, John Wesley was the primary co-writer of Fish's Fellini Days album. He has performed as sideman, guitarist/vocalist for Porcupine Tree, during the In Absentia, Deadwing, Fear of a Blank Planet and The Incident world tours.

In 2005, Wesley produced and recorded his fifth studio release, Shiver. The album was co-produced by drummer and co-owner of his Tampa, Florida. recording studio, RedRoom Recorders, Mark Prator, and mixed by Steven Wilson of Porcupine Tree. In 2011, Wesley partnered with UK native Dean Tidey (live guitarist with Feeder), to produce his EP, The Lilypad Suite. Wesley's sixth full-length studio album, Disconnect, was released in 2014.

On August 24, 2007, Wesley announced that he was making his back catalog of solo material available for free download on his website.

In March 2013, Wesley performed with Sound of Contact as their live guitarist for the Marillion Weekend concert in Montreal, Quebec.  He then joined the band for their European tour in May 2013 and was a part of two Sound of Contact music videos produced in relation to the band's debut album, Dimensionaut.

Other musicians Wesley has worked beside include Sean Malone; Steve Hogarth and Steve Rothery of Marillion as well as a live performer for the Marillion side project Edison's Children featuring Marillion's Pete Trewavas and starring Neil Armstrong's son guitarist Rick Armstrong. He has also performed as an occasional fill-in bassist and lead guitarist for Florida-based group Sister Hazel.

In 2018, Wesley performed lead vocals with international artists ÚMÆ on their debut album titled Lost in the View, which was released on January 3, 2019. Guest performers on this project also include Adam Holzman (Steven Wilson, Miles Davis) and Conner Green (Haken).

In July 2019, Wesley and drummer Mark Prator played with Edison's Children along with the Alan Parsons Project in a concert celebrating the 50th anniversary of the Apollo 11 mission landing on the moon for the first time, in an outdoor concert near the Kennedy Space Center.

In 2021, Wesley began touring as guitarist and backing vocals for Vertical Horizon.

Studio and touring personnel for the John Wesley band:
 John Wesley – guitar and vocals
 Patrick Bettison – bass
 Mark Prator – drums, percussion
 Dean Tidey – guitar
 Geri X – backing vocals

Discography

Studio albums
 1994 – Under the Red and White Sky
 1995 – The Closing of the Pale Blue Eyes
 1998 – The Emperor Falls
 2002 – Chasing Monsters
 2004 – John Wesley: TEN
 2005 – Shiver
 2011 – The Lilypad Suite
 2014 – Disconnect
 2016 – A Way You'll Never Be
 Fellini Days by Fish (co-writing and performing credits)
 With Porcupine Tree (performing credits): In Absentia, Fear of a Blank Planet
 With Porcupine Tree (engineering credits): Fear of a Blank Planet, The Incident
 With Ruud Jolie: For All We Know
 With ÚMÆ: (performing credits): Lost in the View

Singles
 1994 – The Last Light
 1995 – John Wesley
 2003 – Fly Boy

Live releases
 1998 – Waiting for the Sun to Shine in Paris
 1998 – Wesfest 98
 1999 – Starting the Engine II
 1999 – WesFest 1999
 2000 – The John Wesley Bachelor Party Tour
 2002 – The Chicago and Frisco Bootlegs
 2006 – Live at Katie Fitzgerald's
 2009 – Oxford
 2010 – Live at the L'Olympia
 2013 – Live at Morrisound 30th Anniversary Show
 With Fish: Issue 30 CD (From the 1999 Haddington Convention)(2000), Candlelight in Fog (limited edition live album, 3000 copies only)(2000), Sashimi(2001), Fellini Nights (2002)
 With Porcupine Tree: XM, XMII, Rockpalast, Arriving Somewhere..., We Lost The Skyline, Ilosaarirock, Atlanta, Octane Twisted

Videos
 With Porcupine Tree: Arriving Somewhere... September 2006, Anesthetize June 2010, Octane Twisted November 2012
 With Sound of Contact: "Not Coming Down" May 2013, "Cosmic Distance Ladder" May 2013

References

External links
 
 John Wesley's recording studio

Living people
Songwriters from Florida
American male singers
American rock musicians
24 Hour Service Station artists
People from Brandon, Florida
American male songwriters
1962 births